Juan Carlos Infante (born October 8, 1981)  is a Venezeulan-Italian professional baseball infielder, for the Fortitudo Baseball Bologna in the Italian Baseball League.

Playing career
Infante played in the Gulf Coast League for the Montreal Expos in 1999 and 2000 then in the All-American Association for the Fort Worth Cats in 2001, the Northeast League for the New Jersey Jackals in 2004, the Canadian-American Association for the Ottawa Rapides in 2008 and the Golden Baseball League for the Edmonton Cracker-Cats in 2008 before going to Italy.

He also played for the Italy national baseball team in the 2013 World Baseball Classic and with the Orel Anzio of the Italian League.

References

External links

  Italian career statistics 

1981 births
2013 World Baseball Classic players
2015 WBSC Premier12 players
Baseball pitchers
Edmonton Cracker-Cats players
Fort Worth Cats players
Gulf Coast Expos players
Italian baseball players
Italian people of Venezuelan descent
Living people
Naturalised citizens of Italy
New Jersey Jackals players
Orel Anzio players
Ottawa Rapidz players
Baseball players from Caracas
Venezuelan expatriate baseball players in Canada
Venezuelan expatriate baseball players in the United States